The year 2002 is the 10th year in the history of the Ultimate Fighting Championship (UFC), a mixed martial arts promotion based in the United States. In 2002 the UFC held 7 events beginning with, UFC 35: Throwdown.

Title fights

Debut UFC fighters

The following fighters fought their first UFC fight in 2002:

 Aaron Riley
 Amar Suloev
 Andrei Semenov
 Benji Radach
 Chris Haseman
 Genki Sudo
 Hayato Sakurai
 Ivan Salaverry

 James Zikic
 Joao Marcos Pierini
 Keith Rockel
 Kelly Dullanty
 Leigh Remedios
 Mark Weir
 Nick Serra
 Paul Creighton

 Pete Spratt
 Robbie Lawler
 Rodrigo Ruas
 Tim Sylvia
 Travis Wiuff
 Wesley Correira
 Zach Light

Events list

See also
 UFC
 List of UFC champions
 List of UFC events

References

Ultimate Fighting Championship by year
2002 in mixed martial arts